Faxonius hartfieldi, the Yazoo crayfish, is a species of crayfish in the family Cambaridae. It is endemic to Mississippi in the United States.

References

Cambaridae
Endemic fauna of Mississippi
Freshwater crustaceans of North America
Crustaceans described in 1992
Taxa named by Joseph F. Fitzpatrick Jr.
Taxobox binomials not recognized by IUCN